The Anglo-Marri Wars is the name given to three major military conflicts between the Marri Baloch tribesmen and the British Empire in the independent eastern Baloch tribal belt (now known as the North-Eastern region of Baluchistan, Pakistan). The conflicts took place in the 19th and 20th centuries, specifically in 1840, 1880, and 1917.

During these wars, battles were fought mostly in the mountainous tribal areas of Kohistan-e-Marri and adjacent localities. These areas are now under the administrative control of Kohlu, Sibi, Bolan, Barkhan, Nasirabad, and Dera Bugti districts of the Baluchistan province.

First Anglo-Marri War: 1840

Context
By the 1840s, the Baloch had almost lost their national identity after the martyrdom of Mir Mehrab Khan, a Baloch ruler. The subsequent British suzerainty over Kalat State also reduced the Baloch national identity.

At the same time, without the consultation and agreement of the Baloch, a type of mutual understanding had been formalized between the British Raj and kingdom of Iran for the distribution of Baloch territories between them. The people of the Kalat State and the Baluch tribesmen felt that the British and Iranians were becoming masters of their fate.

According to Mir Khuda Bakhsh Marri, the invasions of the Kalat State and the martyrdom of Mir Mehrab Khan, at the hands of the British Army, opened the doors of Balochistan to British interference in political and military affairs. British suzerainty over Balochistan was also a strong possibility. At the same time it generated reactionary feelings of nationalism among the Baloch.

Cause
The negative relations between the Marri people and the British started in 1840 due to attacks made on the communications of Sir John Keane's army after it had passed through the Bolan Pass. In March 1840, Sir John Keane decided that there was a dire need to capture the Kahan and its fort from the Marri tribesmen.

Battles of Kahan
An punitive expedition against the Marri was launched by the British military, which ended in failure. Major Claiborne was repulsed in an attempt to storm the Naffusak Pass, losing 179 of his troops, with an additional 92 wounded out of his force of 650 troops. Many of his troops died of heat and dehydration. The fort of Kahan was forced to capitulate with the honors of war.

Aftermath
The First Anglo-Marri War proved to be a disastrous campaign for the British overall. Although they held the fort of Kahan throughout the campaign, the British forces were unable to establish a proper safe passage to Kahan and continue reinforcing the Kahan Regiment with resources. The Marri tribesmen however faced no such difficulties in their chain of supplies to the area as they were native to the region and were well aware of the hilly terrain.

After this war, in 1843, the Marri once again rose up against the British forces. This time, the cause of the clashes was the occupancy of Sindh by the forces of the British Empire. Being a Baluch tribe, the Marri were worried about the fate of their neighboring state and their ruler. Colonial officer Richard Isaac Bruce wrote about the Marris:

″The Marris were considered absolutely incorrigible, and were proclaimed outlawed and blockaded on all sides. A proclamation was issued on the Sind Frontier offering a reward of ten rupees for the capture of any Marri."

Second Anglo-Marri War: 1880
In 1880, during the Second Afghan War, Marri tribesmen made frequent raids on the British line of communications, ending with the plunder of a treasure convoy. A force of 3070 British troops under Brigadier-General Macgregor marched through the country. The tribe submitted and paid Rs 1/4 lakh (£12,500) out of a fine of 2 lakhs (£20,000). They also gave hostages for their future good behaviour.

Third Anglo-Marri War: 1917
During World War I, British forces were facing a shortage of recruits and started a campaign to enlist the Marri, who ultimately refused to join the British ranks. As a result, clashes broke out in large areas of the Marri land. These actions lasted for many months under the leadership of General Mir Khuda e Dad Khan Marri, with both sides suffering hundreds of casualties. Ultimately Dad Khan Marri embraced martyrdom with two of his younger brothers. In the end the Marri tribe agreed to support the British forces, and were paid money for doing so. Despite this, they still refused to send their youth to join the war.

References

Bibliography
 Defence of Kahan by Charles Reynolds Williams
 The Gazetteer of Baluchistan (Sibi), Gosha-e-Adab publication, Quetta, 1986 (First 1906)
 Imperial Gazetteer of India Provincial Series (Baluchistan), Sheikh Mubarak Ali, Lahore, 1976 (First 1908)
 Baluchistan Historical & Political Processes by A.B. Anwar, New Century Publications London, 1985
 The Forward Policy by Richard Isaac Bruce, Gosha-e-Adab publication, Quetta, 1977 (First 1900)
 Marri Baloch Jange Mazzahimat (English: Marri Baloch, war of resistance) by Shah Mohammad Marri, Takhleeqat publication, Lahore, 1991
 Balochistan Siasi Kashmakash mudhamirat w rujhanaat (English: Baluchistan: Political Struggle) by Justice Munir Ahmed Marri, Gosha-e-Adab publication, Quetta, 1989
 Popular Poetry of the Baluches by M. Longworth Dames, The Royal Asiatic Society London, 1907
  Inside Baluchistan by Mir Ahmad Yar Khan (Khan of Kalat), Royal Book Co. Karachi, 1975
 Problems of Greater Baluchistan by Dr. Inayat Baluch
 History of Baluch Race & Baluchistan by Mohammad Sardar Khan Gishkori, Gosha-e-Adab publication, Quetta, 1979 (First 1958)
 Search Lights on Baluches & Baluchistan by Justice Mir Khuda Bakhsh Marri, Gosha-e-Adab publication, Quetta, 1977 (First 1974)

Sources
 

Marri
Conflicts in 1840
Conflicts in 1880
Conflicts in 1917